Nordic Combined Ski Canada is the governing federation for Nordic Combined in Canada.

References

External links
 http://www.nordiccombinedskicanada.com/

See also
 Canadian Snowboard Federation, Canadian snowboard sports federation
 Canadian Freestyle Ski Association, Canadian freestyle skiing sports federation
 Ski Jumping Canada, Canadian ski jumping sports federation
 Cross Country Canada, Canadian cross country skiing sports federation
 Alpine Canada, Canadian alpine skiing sports federation
 Biathlon Canada, Canadian biathlon ski-shooting sports federation

Nordic
Nordic combined in Canada
Nordic combined organizations